Saccharibacter floricola is an osmophilic acetic acid bacterium first isolated from pollen. It is Gram-negative, aerobic and rod-shaped, with type strain S-877T (=AJ 13480T =JCM 12116T =DSM 15669T). It is the type species of its genus.

References

Further reading

External links

LPSN
Type strain of Saccharibacter floricola at BacDive -  the Bacterial Diversity Metadatabase

Rhodospirillales
Bacteria described in 2004